The 1995 Chicago Cubs season was the 124th season of the Chicago Cubs franchise, the 120th in the National League and the 80th at Wrigley Field. The Cubs finished third in the National League Central with a record of 73–71. This season also marks the 50th anniversary of their last National league pennant of 1945.

Offseason
December 2, 1994: Dave Otto was released by the Chicago Cubs.

Regular season
The Cubs pitching staff did well during the regular season, leading all 28 teams in shutouts, with 12.

Season standings

Record vs. opponents

Notable transactions
April 5, 1995: Brian McRae was traded by the Kansas City Royals to the Chicago Cubs for Derek Wallace and Geno Morones (minors).
May 24, 1995: Felix Jose was signed as a free agent with the Chicago Cubs.
May 26, 1995: Karl Rhodes was selected off waivers by the Boston Red Sox from the Chicago Cubs.
June 1, 1995: Kerry Wood was drafted by the Chicago Cubs in the 1st round (4th pick) of the 1995 amateur draft. Player signed July 28, 1995.
June 1, 1995: Felix Jose was released by the Chicago Cubs.

Roster

Player stats

Batting

Starters by position
Note: Pos = Position; G = Games played; AB = At bats; H = Hits; Avg. = Batting average; HR = Home runs; RBI = Runs batted in

Other batters
Note: G = Games played; AB = At bats; H = Hits; Avg. = Batting average; HR = Home runs; RBI = Runs batted in

Pitching

Starting pitchers
Note: G = Games pitched; IP = Innings pitched; W = Wins; L = Losses; ERA = Earned run average; SO = Strikeouts

Relief pitchers
Note: G = Games pitched; W = Wins; L = Losses; SV = Saves; ERA = Earned run average; SO = Strikeouts

Farm system 

LEAGUE CHAMPIONS: Daytona

References

1995 Chicago Cubs season at Baseball Reference

Chicago Cubs seasons
Chicago Cubs season
Cub